Tracy Natalia Freundt Bonilla is a Peruvian model born and raised in Lima, Peru. Birthday is 22 May 1985. Her body measurements are 90-62-90 at a height of 1,70m.

Her parents are from Ucayali, and her father is a Peruvian citizen of German descent. She is currently co-hosting a very popular youth-oriented show in Peru called Habacilar.

After announcing she was going to participate in the 2005 Miss Peru pageant, she instantly became the crowd favorite. Tracy ended up finishing as first runner up to the winners, Fiorella Castellano and Debora Sulca who were later to participate in Miss World and Miss Universe.

References

Living people
People from Lima
Peruvian female models
Peruvian people of German descent
Peruvian beauty pageant winners
University of Lima alumni
1985 births